Yvette is a 1938 German historical drama film directed by Wolfgang Liebeneiner and starring Käthe Dorsch, Ruth Hellberg and Albert Matterstock. It is based on a short story of the same name by the French writer Guy de Maupassant. It is set in Paris in the 1880s.

Cast
 Käthe Dorsch as Oktavia Obardi  
 Ruth Hellberg as Yvette Obardi  
 Albert Matterstock as Jean Servigny  
 Johannes Riemann as Bankier Aristide de Saval  
 Hans Adalbert Schlettow as Fürst Kravalow  
 Karl Fochler as Chevalier Valreali  
 Albert Florath as Pfarrer von Bougival  
 Paul Bildt as Apotheker von Bougival  
 Gustav Waldau as Marqis von Bougival  
 Franz Weber as Kriegsinvalide Martinez  
 Leopold von Ledebur as Haushofmeister  
 Ellen Bang as Fürstin  
 Pamela Wedekind as Schwester Euphoria  
 Werner von Wulfing as Herr von Belvigne  
 Elsa Andrä Beyer as Hausmädchen Suzanne  
 Gerda Maria Terno as Baronin  
 Margot Erbst as Marquise  
 Lucie Polzin as Nichette  
 Peter Busse as Baron  
 Curt Ackermann as Marquis von Roqueville  
 Kurt Mikulski as Ober in Pariser Café

References

Bibliography 
 Goble, Alan. The Complete Index to Literary Sources in Film. Walter de Gruyter, 1999.

External links 
 

1938 films
1930s historical drama films
German historical drama films
Films of Nazi Germany
1930s German-language films
Films directed by Wolfgang Liebeneiner
Films based on short fiction
Films based on works by Guy de Maupassant
Films set in Paris
Films set in the 1880s
Films about prostitution in Paris
German black-and-white films
Tobis Film films
1938 drama films
1930s German films